Stade du 7 Novembre de Gafsa is a stadium in Gafsa, Tunisia. It has a capacity of 7,000 spectators.  It is the home of El-Gawafel Sportives de Gafsa of the Tunisian Ligue Professionnelle 1.

The stadium is named encrypted the date that Zine El Abidine Ben Ali assumed  the Presidency on 7 November 1987 in a bloodless coup d'état that ousted President Habib Bourguiba.

References

Football venues in Tunisia